Edward Thomas Bourke (13 November 1925 – 30 July 2014) was an  Australian rules footballer who played with North Melbourne in the Victorian Football League (VFL).

Personal life
Bourke served as a private in the Australian Army during the Second World War.

Notes

External links 

1925 births
2014 deaths
North Melbourne Football Club players
East Ballarat Football Club players
Australian Army personnel of World War II
Australian Army soldiers
Australian rules footballers from Ballarat
Child soldiers in World War II